This is a list of some of the breeds of ass or donkey considered in Italy to be wholly or partly of Italian origin. Some may have complex or obscure histories, so inclusion here does not necessarily imply that a breed is predominantly or exclusively Italian.

Principal breeds
 Amiata
 Asinara
 Grigio Siciliano, or Asino Ferrante
 Martina Franca
 Pantesco, or Asino di Pantelleria
 Ragusano
 Romagnolo
 Sardinian

Minor and extinct breeds
 Argentato di Sologno
 Basilicata donkey|Asino della Basilicata
 Asino delle Marche
 Asino dell'Irpinia
 Asino Sardo Grigio Crociato
 Baio Lucano
 Cariovilli
 Castel Morrone
 Emiliano
 Grigio viterbese
 Pugliese
 Sant'Alberto
 Sant'Andrea
 San Domenico
 San Francesco

References

 
Donkey